Jill Teed is a Canadian actress.  She is an actress who has appeared in many sci-fi roles. She has appeared in a number of television guest roles such as Street Justice, The X-Files, Stargate SG-1, Sliders, and The Outer Limits.

Career
She has appeared in such feature films as X2 as Bobby Drake's mother, Mission to Mars and Godzilla. She played the role of FBI Agent Kaayla Brooks in "Reluctant Heroes", a Season Four episode of Highlander: The Series. She played Maggie Sawyer, a Metropolis police chief, on Smallville. She portrayed Sergeant Hadrian, the Galactica's Master-at-Arms, in the first season of Battlestar Galactica. She played Colonel Lasky in the web series Halo 4: Forward Unto Dawn.  She had a prominent supporting role in the television film Seasons of the Heart (1994).

Personal life
Teed has two daughters.

Filmography

Film

Television

References

External links
 
 

Living people
Place of birth missing (living people)
Year of birth missing (living people)
Canadian film actresses
Canadian television actresses
Actresses from Vancouver